Gaëtane Deberdt (born 19 September 1998) is a French judoka.

She won a medal at the 2021 World Judo Championships.

References

External links

1998 births
Living people
French female judoka
Universiade silver medalists for France
Universiade medalists in judo
Medalists at the 2019 Summer Universiade
21st-century French women